Carlos Rodríguez-Feo (5 November 1905 – 26 January 1995) was a Cuban sports shooter. He competed in the 25 m pistol event at the 1948 Summer Olympics.

References

External links

1905 births
1995 deaths
Cuban male sport shooters
Olympic shooters of Cuba
Shooters at the 1948 Summer Olympics
Cuban emigrants to the United States
20th-century Cuban people